Annie Riis (29 October 1927 – 26 February 2020) was a Norwegian poet, novelist and children's writer.

She made her literary debut in 1975 with the poetry collection Satura. Among her other collections are Mellom høye trær from 1979 and Satirens tid from 1994. She was awarded the Brage Prize (open class) in 2001 for the poetry collection Himmel av stål and the Herman Wildenvey Poetry Award in 2002.

Among her novels are Azoras hus from 1988 and Fridafrank from 1991. She wrote several children's books.

She died in February 2020 at the age of 92.

References

1927 births
2020 deaths
20th-century Norwegian poets
20th-century Norwegian novelists
21st-century Norwegian novelists
Norwegian children's writers
21st-century Norwegian poets
Norwegian women poets
20th-century Norwegian women writers
21st-century Norwegian women writers